LibreCAD is a computer-aided design (CAD) application for 2D design. It is free and open-source, and available for Linux, macOS, and Windows operating systems.

Most of the interface and handle concepts are analogous to AutoCAD, making it easier to use for users with experience in this type of commercial CAD application.

History
Around 2010, the QCAD Community Edition v2.0.5.0 was forked to start the development of what is now known as LibreCAD.  Originally, the GUI was based on Qt3 libraries.

LibreCAD relies on a GUI based on Qt5 libraries, so it can run on several platforms in the same way.

The GNU LibreDWG library is released under GPLv3, so it cannot be used by GPLv2-licensed LibreCAD (and FreeCAD) because their licenses are incompatible. A request also went to the FSF to relicense GNU LibreDWG as GPLv2, which was rejected. The problem was eventually resolved by writing a new GPLv2-licensed library called libdxfrw, with more complete DWG support.

Features
LibreCAD is available in over 30 languages.  It uses the AutoCAD DXF file format internally for import and save files, as well as allowing export to many other file formats.

File formats
As of version 2.2.0, LibreCAD is capable of reading and writing the following file formats:

Open File or Import Block
 CAD : DXF, DWG, JWW
 CAD font : LFF, CXF

Import Image
 Vector image : SVG, SVGZ
 Bitmap image : BMP, CUR, GIF, ICNS, ICO, JPEG, JPG, PBM, PGM, PNG, PPM, TGA, TIF, TIFF, WBMP, WEBP, XBM, XPM

Save File
 CAD : DXF (2007), DXF (2004), DXF (2000), DXF (R14), DXF (R12)
 CAD font : LFF, CXF

Export
 PDF
 Vector image : SVG, CAM (Plain SVG)
 Bitmap image : BMP, CUR, ICNS, ICO, JPG, PBM, PGM, PNG, PPM, TIF, WBMP, WEBP, XBM, XPM

See also
 Comparison of computer-aided design software

References

External links 

 
 
 
 LibreCAD User Manual

2011 software
Computer-aided design software for Linux
Computer-aided design software for Windows
Engineering software that uses Qt
Free computer-aided design software
Free software programmed in C++
MacOS computer-aided design software
Software that uses Qt
Software using the GPL license